Thomas William Heney (5 November 1862 – 19 August 1928) was an Australian journalist and poet.  

Heney was the son of Thomas William Heney (Snr), a printer, and Sarah Elizabeth, née Carruthers.  He was born in Sydney and educated at Cooma. Heney Senior was a heavy drinker and died in 1875. 

Heney joined the staff of The Sydney Morning Herald as a junior assistant reader in 1878, and became a reporter on the Sydney Daily Telegraph six years later. He was editor of the Western Grazier at Wilcannia in 1886 but returned to Sydney in 1889 and worked on the Echo until it ceased publication in 1893. In 1896, he married Amy, daughter of Henry Gullett.

Heney rejoined the Herald as a reviewer and writer of occasional leaders, was appointed associate editor in 1899, and editor in October 1903. He held this position until 1918 and was subsequently editor of the Brisbane Telegraph from 1920 to 1923, and the Sydney Daily Telegraph from 1923 to 1925. 

He retired on account of ill health in 1925, and died of heart disease at Springwood in the Blue Mountains on 19 August 1928 and was buried in the Anglican cemetery. He was survived by his wife, a son and two daughters. 

Heney was a modest man and a first-rate journalist, with a sense of the responsibility of his office as an editor. He published two volumes of poetry, Fortunate Days in 1886 and In Middle Harbour in 1890; but though he is represented in several anthologies his cultivated verse seldom reaches beyond the edge of poetry. His novel, The Girl at Birrell's, is a simple story of pastoral life told with some ability. Another novel, A Station Courtship, was serialized in the Melbourne Leader in 1898–99.

References

Ken Stewart, 'Heney, Thomas William (1862–1928)', Australian Dictionary of Biography, Volume 9, MUP, 1983, pp 258–259. Retrieved 13 March 2009

Australian poets
Australian journalists
1862 births
1928 deaths
Australian literary critics
The Sydney Morning Herald people